Indica ( Indikḗ) is the name of a short military history about interior Asia, particularly the Indian subcontinent, written by Arrian in the 2nd century CE. The subject of the book is the expedition of Alexander the Great that occurred between 336 and 323 BCE, about 450 years before Arrian. The book mainly tells the story of Alexander's officer Nearchus' voyage from India to the Persian Gulf after Alexander the Great's conquest of the Indus Valley. However, much of the importance of the work comes from Arrian's in-depth asides describing the history, geography, and culture of the Ancient India. Arrian wrote his Indica in the Ionic dialect, taking Herodotus for his literary mode.

Arrian was born in 86 CE, did not visit the Indian subcontinent, and the book is based on a variety of legends and texts known to Arrian, such as the Indica by Megasthenes. Arrian also wrote a companion text, Anabasis. Of all ancient Greek records available about Alexander and interior Asia, Arrian's texts are considered most authoritative.

Historical period
Indica deals with the period of Alexander the Great. After Alexander's expedition in the Indus Valley, he planned to return to the center of his empire in Babylon. Alexander planned to return himself over land but wanted to learn about the mouth of the Indus (which he himself did not reach) and the sea between India and Babylon. Therefore, he sent one of his officers, Nearchus, to perform such a voyage and report what he saw. Indica mostly describes what Nearchus saw on that voyage.

About the author
Indica was written by Arrian, a Greek historian, public servant, military commander and philosopher of the Roman period. Arrian's work is considered the best source on the campaigns of Alexander the Great.

Overview
Indica begins with a description of the geography of India, in particular focusing on the size of the rivers Indus and the Ganges, together with their tributaries. A comparison is made with the Danube and the Nile.

The text then proceeds to tell the stories of Heracles and Dionysus in India.

Indica also describes the classes of occupation that the Indians have and their overall social structure. The text also describes their manner of hunting (which includes a description of many of the great fauna of India) and making war.

The text then moves into the story of Nearchus' voyage from India to Babylon following the conquests of Alexander the Great. From this point onwards, the text mostly tells the story of a naval adventure. However, Arrian leaves the main story from time to time to tell in detail about the various peoples that lived along the way, as of the Ichthyophagi. Occasionally, Arrian describes Nearchus' soldiers' battles with the local people.

The book ends with Nearchus meeting up with Alexander the Great, who had been conducting his own land voyage from India to Susa. Nearchus is congratulated for a safe journey and rewarded for his efforts.

Arrian's sources
Arrian draws upon a number of ancient sources in composing his Indica. His main source is the account written by Nearchus. This text is now mostly lost, but it appears that Arrian had an extant and complete copy in his own time.

Arrian also drew on a number of other ancient writers, including Eratosthenes and, most notably, Megasthenes (whose own book was also named Indica).

As a historical source
Indica'''s importance as a historical source can be judged in three ways: (1) as fact, (2) as a reflection of the influence of Alexander's campaign on human knowledge, and (3) as a window onto Greek and Roman knowledge.

Indica as fact
The detailed aside stories in Indica are not completely accurate. Indica in no way can be compared with our modern knowledge of the areas and peoples it describes.

Because local histories of some of the places described in Indica are not extant or widely available, Indica remains a valuable although disputed source of information regarding the ancient peoples of, for example, ancient Persia and Indian subcontinent.

Reflection of the influence of Alexander's campaignIndica is useful as a historical source in establishing the influence of Alexander's campaign. For the first time, a large body of knowledge about the Near East, Central Asia, and India was reaching Greece. Information was exchanged in all directions: the whole of Alexander's empire experienced somewhat of a cultural shift in one way or another. As knowledge from and about the East moved west, knowledge from and about the West moved east.Indica is important for showing how some of that knowledge was gained. The text makes clear that Alexander had high hopes for gaining and disseminating knowledge about his empire. Nearchus' voyage explains how Alexander went about learning about the world and gives some insight into the amount of never before exchanged knowledge his conquests resulted in spreading.

Indica as a window onto Greek and Roman knowledge
The Indica provides the historian a good idea of how the Greeks and Romans saw India. Though, as stated above, everything in Indica is not completely factual in its details, it is useful to know what the Greeks and Romans thought of India and how they may have viewed it. Some descriptions about Indian people from the Indica:

 "The southern Indians resemble the Ethiopians a good deal, and, are black of countenance, and their hair black also, only they are not as snub-nosed or so woolly-haired as the Ethiopians; but the northern Indians are most like the Egyptians in appearance."
 "No Indian ever went outside his own country on a warlike expedition, so righteous were they."
 "Indians do not put up memorials to the dead; but they regard their virtues as sufficient memorials for the departed, and the songs which they sing at their funerals."
 "This also is remarkable in India, that all Indians are free, and no Indian at all is a slave. In this the Indians agree with the Lacedaemonians. Yet the Lacedaemonians have helots for slaves, who perform the duties of slaves; but the Indians have no slaves at all, much less is any Indian a slave."
 "The Indians generally are divided into seven castes, the wise men, farmers, herdsmen, artisans and shopkeepers, soldiers, overlookers, and government officials including army and navy officers."
 "The Indians in shape are thin and tall and much lighter in movement than the rest of mankind."

References

External links

Arrian, The Indica translated by E. Iliff Robson.

Reference and further readingArrian'', Volume II, Loeb Classical Library, tr. P.A. Brunt, 1983

2nd-century history books
History of India
Foreign relations of ancient India
Works by Arrian
Ancient Greek military books
Roman-era Greek historiography
Texts in Ionic Greek